The Pearson Lark, also called the Lark 24, is an American trailerable sailboat that was designed by William Shaw as a cruiser and first built in 1966.

The Lark design was developed into the Pearson 24 in 1967.

Production
The design was built by Pearson Yachts in the United States between 1966 and 1968, with 67 boats completed, but it is now out of production.

Design
The Lark is a recreational keelboat, built predominantly of fiberglass, with wood trim. It has a masthead sloop rig, a flush-deck; a raked stem; a raised counter, angled transom; a keel-mounted rudder controlled by a tiller and a fixed modified long keel with a cutaway forefoot. It displaces  and carries  of ballast.

The design has sleeping accommodation for four people, with a double "V"-berth in the bow cabin and two quarter berths in aft of the main cabin. The galley located on the port side of the main cabin and is equipped with a two-burner under-counter stove and a sink. The head is located opposite the gallery, on the starboard side.

Operational history
The boat is supported by an active class club, the Pearson Yachts Portal.

In a 2010 review Steve Henkel wrote, "in 1985 I interviewed designer Bill Shaw, then executive vice president and chief designer for Pearson Yachts. He recalled the Lark being built 'during a period when flush-deck types of boats were sort of popular. On the West Coast, they were very successful, and of course, in a small boat a flush deck gives you a tremendous amount of volume... . I've always been partial to that type of design.' But, he said, 'they’re not as popular as I would like them to be. ... The buyer likes change ... but not radical ideas.' The design was dropped after three or four years of low-volume production. Note that when he was with S&S Sparkman & Stephens, Shaw also did most of the design work on the racing-oriented Dolphin 24, a comp of the Lark, which was later produced by several builders. Best features: Just as designer Shaw said, on the Lark there's plenty of space below ... Worst features: Compared with her comp[etitor]s, the cruising oriented Lark has the highest PHRF rating, and the lowest Motion Index. You pays yer money and you takes yer choice."

See also
List of sailing boat types

References

External links
Video of sailing a Lark 24
Video of sailing a Lark 24

Keelboats
1960s sailboat type designs
Sailing yachts
Trailer sailers
Sailboat type designs by William Shaw
Sailboat types built by Pearson Yachts